ACSI (Associated Computer Systems Institute) College  or ACSI is a network of private computer and business colleges. It has two colleges: ACSI College Iloilo and ACSI Caregiver School

History
It was founded as Associated Computer Systems Institute in 1984 with its first campus at Luna, La Paz, Iloilo City. At first it offered diploma courses in computer. It changed its name to ACSI Business and Computer School, Inc, and moved to a new location at the City Proper of Iloilo.

In 2008 the college offered two CHED programs: Bachelor of Science in Computer Science and Bachelor of Science in Computer Systems. Following that, it changed its name to ACSI College. It caters both courses accredited by Technical Education and Skills Development Authority and Commission on Higher Education of the Philippines in information technology, hospitality management, health sciences, business and short term courses.

As of 2016 there are three CHED recognized programs.

In 2018, the college moved to its present location in Gaisano Capital Iloilo (La Paz) in La Paz, Iloilo City.

Academic programs
ACSI College offers programs senior high school, bachelor and non-bachelor's degrees under the supervision and accreditation of Department Education for basic education, CHED (Commission on Higher Education (Philippines)) for undergraduate degrees, and Technical Education and Skills Development Authority (TESDA) for associate or 2 years and tech-voc courses. The college also offers short term certificate courses. ACSI is a CHED Certified Higher Education Institution- (Institutional Code: 06009)

Select academic courses are both offered in regular and night classes.

Senior High School

 HUMMS Track
 ABM Track

Associate or TESDA courses

 Associate in Computer Technology (ACT)
 Hotel and Restaurant Service NCIV (HRS NCIV)
 Computer Programming NC IV
 Computer Hardware Servicing NC IV
 Caregiver NC IV

Baccalaureate or undergraduate courses

 Bachelor of Science in Computer Science (BSCS) [Regular and Night Modular Classe)
 Bachelor of Science in Information Systems (BSIS) [Regular and Night Modular Classes]

Short term certificate courses

 * Adobe Photoshop CS6/CC, Computer Operation, Animation and Computer Servicing.

References

External links

Universities and colleges in Iloilo City
1984 establishments in the Philippines
Educational institutions established in 1984